Domala may refer to:

 Domala, Pakistan, village in Punjab, Pakistan
 MV Domala, ship